Mordellistena difficilis is a species of beetle in the genus Mordellistena of the family Mordellidae. It was described in 1963 by Ermisch and is endemic to Cyprus.

References

difficilis
Beetles described in 1963
Endemic arthropods of Cyprus
Beetles of Europe